Oklahoma Justice is a 1951 American Western film directed by Lewis D. Collins and starring Johnny Mack Brown, James Ellison and Lane Bradford.
 
The film's sets were designed by the art director Dave Milton.

Partial cast
Johnny Mack Brown as Johnny Mack Brown
James Ellison as Clancy
Lane Bradford as Henchman Deuce Logan
Phyllis Coates as Goldie Vaughn
I. Stanford Jolley as Sam Fleming
Marshall Reed as Blackie Martin
Barbara Woodell as Ma Posey
Zon Murray as Henchnan Tad
Richard Avonde as Henchman Hartley
Stanley Price as bartender
Kenne Duncan as Sheriff Barnes

References

External links

1951 Western (genre) films
American Western (genre) films
Films directed by Lewis D. Collins
Monogram Pictures films
Films scored by Raoul Kraushaar
American black-and-white films
1950s English-language films
1950s American films